Alban Howell Causse Thomas (9 February 1872 – 4 November 1957) was an Australian rules footballer who played for the South Melbourne Football Club in the Victorian Football League (VFL).

Notes

External links 

1872 births
1957 deaths
Australian rules footballers from Victoria (Australia)
Sydney Swans players